Baldwin Chiu (born May 17, 1974), known professionally as Only Won, is an American rapper, actor, producer and stunt performer. As a hip hop artist, he writes/performs rap, beatboxing, and singing. He is also a member of the Screen Actors Guild involved in acting and choreographing stunt work. Only Won started rapping professionally in 1991 after being influenced by hip hop pioneers Run DMC, Will Smith, dcTalk, and T-Bone. Because he started rapping in both English and Cantonese, some consider him to be the first Chinese American bilingual rapper. "This Chinese American rapper has a refreshing and unique sound with a message born out of experience, having been in the game since '91." At one point, he was labeled the "Christian" version of "Jin the MC".

Career
Among these things, Only Won is also a professionally licensed mechanical engineer with a PE License deeming him the "Lyrical Engineer". The title track of his LP (The Lyrical Engineer), provides an exposition of the life and livelihood of a professional engineer. It demonstrates Only Won's technological acumen as well as his lyrical wit and dexterity.
Only Won is also a favored guest speaker at conventions, schools, and youth events challenging and encouraging the next generation to pursue their dreams and passions while maintaining an education and focus on God.

Signed in 2009 under Los Angeles record label, LOG Records. Only Won has appeared as both a host and musical guest on JCTV and has been featured on collaboration albums. Only Won's release, "The Lyrical Engineer" is produced by Grammy nominated group Dynamic Twins, Billboard winner Maximillian and Larissa Lam. The music video was directed and edited by Emmy Award-winning director, Marlon Jones. Only Won and Larissa Lam launched a viral music video title "Cantonese Boy" which was a parody of the Grammy winning song American Boy by Kanye West and Estelle. After being seen performing "Cantonese Boy" in Chinatown, Only Won was asked to perform at the 2010 Green Globe Film Awards as they honored Asians in film and entertainment.

As an actor and member of SAG, he appears in many feature films such as The Matrix Reloaded and The Matrix Revolutions, xXx2: State of the Union, Twisted, and Pursuit of Happyness. He has also provided music for the soundtrack of Dead Man Down and the animated film, "The Monkey Prince".

He is also an advanced level martial artists having trained under the lineage of Kanbun Uechi and Wong Doc-Fai. He is a 3 time UC Berkeley Wushu Champion in tai chi, weapons, and push hands  and teaches Tai Chi in Hollywood. He has used some of his skills in choreographing fight scenes in movies and doing stunt work for Ang Lee in the movie Hulk.

On April 29, 2010, California State University, Sacramento, honored high-achieving alumni at an annual award ceremony called the "Distinguished Service Awards". This is the highest recognized award for CSU Sacramento. Baldwin was recognized for his contributions in engineering, his performances as Only Won: The Lyrical Engineer and other entertainment industry endeavors as well as his work with youth. He received this award alongside KXTV ABC News anchor Cristina Mendonsa.

On Pi day 2012, Intel asked Only Won to be part of President Barack Obama's national White House campaign titled, Stay With It, designed to boost retention of students in undergraduate engineering programs.

Only Won releases

Other work
Tai Chiu Music was set up in 2008. After moving its location from Sacramento, California, TCM joined forces with LOG Records and producer Larissa Lam in Los Angeles.

In 2011, Only Won released a "Geeked out" remix video of the hit song "Billionaire", titled "I Wanna Be An Engineer", which was a parody that reached viral status and caught the attention of CNN, Discovery Channel, The Pentagon, and FIRST Robotics Competition. The song became the anthem to those in the engineering, technology, and science community. It also reached No. 2 on Reddit.com on the viral hits list, gaining over 400,000 views in less than two weeks. The song "Crush 'em Like Godzilla" was inspired by Ed Wang, the first NFL player of full Chinese descent.

In summer 2012, Only Won released two songs on the video game Sleeping Dogs.

In Spring 2013, the song "JUN BAY" (aka: Get ready) was featured on the film Dead Man Down.

Reissues on other labels
LOG Records issued the 2010 release of Only Won-The Lyrical Engineer tracks for download, through major outlets (Amazon, iTunes, CD Baby, Nimbitmusic, etc.). Also featured with Holland music collaborating with One Truth.

Filmography

Film Maker 
In 2015, Only Won produced a Documentary short titled, Finding Cleveland with Larissa Lam as the director and music composer. It garnished multiple nominations for Best Documentary. In 2016, Finding Cleveland won Best Documentary at the Oxford Film Festival. The story started as a journey for him to search for his family roots, but instead of taking him to the far east, it took him into the deep south of Cleveland, MS. While the 12-minute documentary focuses on the family's discoveries about their roots, it also touches on a broader history, such as the treatment of Asian immigrants in the region and the role the Chinese Exclusion Act played in that.

On May 2021, his multi-ward winning film Far East Deep South released on PBS America_ReFramed.

Awards
Distinguished Service Award 1st ever Rising Star Award (2010).

Personal life
In March 2008, he married American talk show host, Singer/songwriter, director and producer Larissa Lam. The couple currently reside in Los Angeles, California.

Outreach and Community Work
Only Won has worked with the community and uses his platform as an entertainer and engineer to encourage people to continue to seek out their dreams without giving up their education. He strives to use his music to bridge a culture that needs to hear and feel the love of God.

See also
 JCTV

References

External links
Hear It First
Cross Rhythms

1974 births
Living people
American beatboxers
American choreographers
American male film actors
American mechanical engineers
American musicians of Chinese descent
American people of Hong Kong descent
American rappers of Asian descent
American stunt performers
California State University, Sacramento alumni
Engineers from California
Male actors from the San Francisco Bay Area
Musicians from Pasadena, California
Rappers from the San Francisco Bay Area
West Coast hip hop musicians
21st-century American rappers